Harry Flaherty (born April 26, 1989) is a former American football tight end. He played college football at Princeton University.

Early years
Flaherty attended Red Bank Catholic High School, where he practiced football and track. He was a two-way player at tight end and linebacker. In his career, he posted 36 receptions for 580 yards, 8 touchdowns and 200 tackles. He was a two-time All-county selection and received All-conference honors as a senior.

He accepted a football scholarship from Princeton University. As a junior, he was named a starter at tight end, registering 18 receptions for 193 yards. He had 5 receptions for 47 yards against Harvard University. 

As a senior, he tallied 25 receptions for 212 yards and was used mostly for blocking purposes. He finished his college career with 43 receptions for 405 yards and one pass completion for a touchdown. He also played as a long snapper.

Professional career
Flaherty was signed as an undrafted free agent by the New Orleans Saints after the 2011 NFL Draft on July 27. He was released before the start of the season on August 4.

On August 15, 2012, he was signed as a free agent by the Dallas Cowboys, to provide depth at tight end. During his time with the team, he was coached by his uncles Jason Garrett and John Garrett. He was released before the start of the season on August 27.

Personal life
His father Harry Flaherty Sr., played linebacker in the NFL for the Dallas Cowboys. His uncles are Jason Garrett, John Garrett and Judd Garrett. His grandfather was NFL coach and scout Jim Garrett.

From 2013 to 2014, he helped to coach tight ends at the University of Tennessee as a graduate football assistant. In March 2015, Flaherty was named as head coach of the football team at the Lawrenceville School in Lawrenceville, New Jersey. He was also the Junior varsity baseball coach, a history teacher, dorm leader, and an associate dean of admission at the school. In 2021, he was named the football head coach at St. Mark's School of Texas in Dallas.

References

External links
Princeton Tigers bio

1989 births
Living people
People from Oceanport, New Jersey
Sportspeople from Monmouth County, New Jersey
Players of American football from New Jersey
American football tight ends
Princeton Tigers football players
Red Bank Catholic High School alumni
High school football coaches in New Jersey
High school football coaches in Texas
Garett family